Los Naranjos is the name for an archaeological region in western Honduras. It lies on the north border of Lake Yojoa. It is significant to the region because of its implications on determining where the Mayan frontier existed, as well as which ancient peoples were in contact and what relations between "tribes" may have been like. Whether or not the Olmec influenced the people of the Lake Yojoa region is disputed.

Archaeological excavations
In 1935, Frans Blom and Jens Yde conducted an excavation of a large mound at Los Naranjos. They found a large collection of polychrome pottery. They believed the large mound, which was one of many, was a burial mound because the bowls and pots they found were deliberately buried there. J.B. Edwards, a former Harvard botanist, helped Blom and Yde in their exploration of the site. He had excavated there in the past and had a large collection of antiquities. Yde purchased many of the specimens for the Danish National Museum. One particular vessel that Yde purchased became a topic of interest and was coined "the Yde Vessel".

From 1967 to 1969, archaeologists Claude F. Baudez and Pierre Becquelin periodically excavated the region. The two published the work Archeologie de Los Naranjos as a field guide for their findings. The work was written in French and an English translation is not readily available. The book includes both pictures of artifacts and tables that explain periods and locations of uncovered antiquities. They found sherds of ceramic vessels that came from four different periods, suggesting prolonged use of the site. 

They used four phases from which the artifacts they discovered came: Jaral (800–400 B.C.), Eden which is divided into Eden I (400–100 B.C.) and Eden II (100 B.C.–A.D. 550), Yojoa (A.D. 550-950) and Rio Blanco (A.D. 950-1250). Various antiquities found at the site include jade figurines, clay pottery and a jadeite hand axe, many of which suggest relation to Olmec influence in mesoamerica during the time. Clay pottery included findings of polychrome, monochrome and Ulua bichrome coloration. Each varying coloration seems to have existed in different periods.

The stratigraphy, or way that strata separate periods, suggests that the region had been occupied for a long period. The oldest layers of strata contained monochrome pottery with little or no design. Sherds of pottery in the nearby La Sierra site seem to have direct ties with the pottery of Los Naranjos in the Late Classic period. Newer layers of strata showed polychrome pottery that was more advanced. Most of the pottery found in the region was made locally, although some may have been traded for. 

Radiocarbon dating of seven sherds from the excavation site provided the basis for the periods. The white-slipped polychrome pottery of the Terminal Classic period at Los Naranjos is "Las Vegas" polychrome, similar to types of "Las Vegas" polychrome at Comayagua. It is in close stylistic relation to sherds from Rivas Papagayo but earlier in date.

The Yde Vessel
A clay vessel that is of particular interest was discovered at Los Naranjos. The vessel, in comparison with other pottery found at the site, is large and extraordinarily decorated. The remaining fragment is 24.4 cm high and the rim appeared to have a diameter of about 23 cm. The decoration of the pottery is in black and red with the base of the vessel being orange. The designs depict "dancing figures" which is a common theme of art from the time period. The figures are seen in a cave. Archaeologist and historians attribute the setting of the cave as part of a common motif, incorporating ideas of the first humans and genesis of humankind. Nielsen and Brady believe that a deity, represented by a crocodilian  figure outside the cave, is a symbol of fertility and was believed to preside over the genesis of mankind.

In The Couple in the Cave Jesper Nielsen and James E. Brady propose that the people of Los Naranjos may have believed that Lake Yojoa and the Cave of Taulabé were the birthplace of humans. They go on to say that in Mesoamerican cultures, having territory near the birthplace of mankind was invaluable.

Ditches

The site contained two large ditches, one that stretched from Lake Yojoa to a pool just north of an encampment, made during the Jaral phase. The second ditch was probably constructed during the Eden phase. The purpose of the ditches is disputed, however there is evidence to support the idea that they were probably used as a defense mechanism. Another possibility was that they were filled with water, however the bedrock at the bottom of the ditches is seemingly too porous for a water well.

People of Los Naranjos
 
It is presumed that the people of Los Naranjos spoke Lenca, a language that is indigenous to Honduras and El Salvador. The Lenca language is nearly extinct in modern times and there is a movement to preserve and restore the language, as there are still people of Lenca origin.

Baudez and Becquelin found evidence for a hierarchical society at Los Naranjos. Among the buried, there was a varying array of antiquities, some more advanced than others. People having been buried differently suggested to Baudez and Becquelin that a hierarchy may have been in place.

Affiliations with other Mesoamerican cultures

It appears that the people of Los Naranjos had temporal variations in cultural relations with other Mesoamerican societies. Antiquities from the Jaral phase suggest relation with the Olmec. Jade workings and Olmec influenced sherds were present during the time period and trade may have been possible. During the phase Eden II, the pottery of the region had little or no similarities with Tzakol pottery. The region may have been on the periphery of Maya and other Mesoamerican peoples during the Eden phase. Strata from the Late Classic Period, however, revealed that half of the pottery that the people used was of Maya relation. The Maya-related pottery was Polychrome.

Notes

Bibliography

 
 
 
 
 
 
 
 

Naranjos, Los
Naranjos, Los
Mesoamerican sites